In mathematics, a Feller-continuous process is a continuous-time stochastic process for which the expected value of suitable statistics of the process at a given time in the future depend continuously on the initial condition of the process. The concept is named after Croatian-American mathematician William Feller.

Definition

Let X : [0, +∞) × Ω → Rn, defined on a probability space (Ω, Σ, P), be a stochastic process. For a point x ∈ Rn, let Px denote the law of X given initial value X0 = x, and let Ex denote expectation with respect to Px. Then X is said to be a Feller-continuous process if, for any fixed t ≥ 0 and any bounded, continuous and Σ-measurable function g : Rn → R, Ex[g(Xt)] depends continuously upon x.

Examples

 Every process X whose paths are almost surely constant for all time is a Feller-continuous process, since then Ex[g(Xt)] is simply g(x), which, by hypothesis, depends continuously upon x.
 Every Itô diffusion with Lipschitz-continuous drift and diffusion coefficients is a Feller-continuous process.

See also

 Continuous stochastic process

References

  (See Lemma 8.1.4)

Stochastic processes